Ditram Nchimbi (born 10 March 1997) is a Tanzanian football striker who plays for Geita Gold Mine FC.

References

1997 births
Living people
Tanzanian footballers
Tanzania international footballers
Maji Maji F.C. players
Mbeya City F.C. players
Azam F.C. players
Polisi FC players
Young Africans S.C. players
Association football forwards
Tanzanian Premier League players
Tanzania A' international footballers
2020 African Nations Championship players